86th Street is a major two-way street in the Upper East Side and Upper West Side of the New York City borough of Manhattan. It runs in two major sections: between East End and Fifth Avenues on the Upper East Side, and between Central Park West and Riverside Drive on the Upper West Side. The western segment feeds into the 86th Street transverse across Central Park, which connects to East 84th and 85th Streets on the eastern side.

On the West Side its continuous cliff-wall of apartment blocks including The Belnord is broken by two contrasting landmarked churches at prominent corner sites, the Tuscan Renaissance Saints Paul and Andrew United Methodist Church at the corner of West End Avenue, and the rusticated brownstone Romanesque Revival West-Park Presbyterian Church at the corner of Amsterdam Avenue.

History 

Until the years following World War II, Yorkville on the East Side was a predominantly German community, and East 86th Street was nicknamed the German Broadway.  The early settlement originally clustered around the 86th Street stop of the New York and Harlem Railroad. Since the late 1980s, nearly all distinctly German shops have disappeared, apart from a few restaurants on Second Avenue.  The street was commonly considered a boundary for public utilities.  For example, different telephone exchanges at East 79th and 97th Streets served the north and south sides of the street.  Local number portability in the early 21st century allowed transferring phone numbers to either side.

A sunken street through Central Park, the 86th Street transverse, connects West 86th Street with eastbound East 84th Street and westbound East 85th Street.  Miners Gate provides pedestrian access to the park at East 86th, and Mariners Gate at West 85th.

Transportation
The M86 Select Bus Service bus serves the street. Until the 1950s, the Second Avenue and Third Avenue elevated lines served 86th Street on the East Side.

The New York and Harlem Railroad used to operate an 86th Street rail line which ran on the surface from Central Park West, through Central Park and on to York Avenue. The line then turned north and terminated at the Astoria Ferry landing at 92nd Street.

It is currently served by the following New York City Subway stations:
 86th Street at Broadway serving the 
 86th Street at Central Park West serving the 
 86th Street at Lexington Avenue serving the 
 86th Street at Second Avenue serving the 

The New York Central Railroad's 86th Street station previously existed on Park Avenue, which now carries the Park Avenue main line of the Metro-North Railroad. The station opened in 1876. The station was last listed on the May 20, 1901 timetable and was left off the June 23, 1901 timetable. An emergency exit is the only vestige of the station's existence.

Notable residents

East

  – actress
 Elaine Kaufman (former) – owner and operator of Elaine's
 Rush Limbaugh (former) – radio talk show host
 Mary Tyler Moore (former) – actress
 Joe Namath (former) – professional football player
 John Paulson – hedge fund manager

West

 Diamond Jim Brady (former) – businessman and philanthropist 
 Katie Couric (former) – news anchor
 Susan Crile – artist
 Tom Cruise (former) – actor, lived at 50 West 86th Street in 1981
 Art D'Lugoff (former) – owner of The Village Gate
 Robert Downey Jr./Sarah Jessica Parker (former) – actors; lived together at 50 West 86th Street
 Robert Duvall– actor 
 Renee Fleming – opera "diva"
 Jami Floyd – TV anchor
 Joe Franklin – radio and television personality
 Andrew Goodman (former) – Queens College anthropology student, Freedom Summer volunteer of the Congress of Racial Equality, famed civil rights activist and martyr, close friend of Paul Simon
 William Randolph Hearst (former) – publishing magnate
 Amos E. Joel, Jr. (former) – inventor of the cellular phone
 John F. Kennedy Jr. (former) – publisher and son of John F. Kennedy
 Megyn Kelly – journalist, talk show host, and television news anchor 
 Christine Lahti – actress 
 Julianne Moore (former) – actress
 Grete Mosheim Gould – German silent film actress
 Zero Mostel (former) – actor
 Richard Rodgers (former) – composer
 Isabella Rossellini (former) – actress 
 Emery Roth (former) – Beaux Arts and Art Deco architect who designed The Normandy where he lived
 Jerry Schatzberg – director 
 Isaac Bashevis Singer (former) – Nobel Prize winning author; West 86th Street between Broadway and Amsterdam Avenue was renamed Isaac Bashevis Singer Boulevard in his honor
 Sorvino family:
Mira Sorvino – actress
 Paul Sorvino (former) – actor
 Lee Strasberg (former) – acting teacher and actor 
 Moon Zappa (former) – actress, musician and author, eldest daughter of Frank Zappa in the early 1990s

See also
 Yorkville
225 East 86th Street, a building located on the block between Second and Third Avenues

References
Notes

External links

086